Rosary High School is a co-educational high school in Pratapgunj, Vadodara, Gujarat, India managed by the Society of Jesus and recognized by the Gujarat Secondary and Higher Secondary Education Board. Though a Catholic institution, it welcomes pupils of all castes and creeds and prepares them for the Secondary School certificate and Higher Secondary School Certificate Examinations. It comprises classes from Kindergarten through 10th grade with parallel divisions, having Gujarati and English as the media of instruction. The school also runs Science and Commerce Streams for 11th and 12th grade students. Rosary students are known as Rosarites.

The school prepares its pupils for the Secondary School Certificate and Higher Secondary School Certificate.

In a 2008 survey by Education World, the school was ranked 19th in the Western region and 61st overall.

Infrastructure 

 2 Computer labs
 Physics lab
 Chemistry lab
 Biology lab
 Library
 Art Room
 A/V Hall
 Auditorium
 Laboratory for Secondary Section
 Football ground 
 Basketball Court 
 Canteen

Academics

Terms 
The school year is divided into two terms divided by two break groups
 Term 1 - from around 15 June to around 23 December including a Diwali break of about 19–21 days.
 Christmas break - 7- to 10-day break from around 24 December to 31 December.
 Term 2 - from the beginning of the calendar year to around 15 April (This is the end of the school year).
 Summer Vacation - 2-month vacation from around 16 April to 14 June.

There are two term examinations (in September and January) followed by a final examination in April. The term examinations typically count towards 25% of the net marks and the final examination count towards 50%.

Subjects 
A typical set of subjects taught to students is the following:
 English grammar
 English literature
 Hindi
 Gujarati
 Sanskrit
 Physical Education
 Science (split into Physics, Chemistry and Biology for the older students)
 Mathematics
 Social Studies (History, Geography, Civics)
 Art (drawing and painting)
 Computer basics

Sports 

The school has the following facilities :
 Football ground which is also used to play hockey and cricket.
 Open-air volleyball court
 Open-air basketball court
 The main gathering hall doubles as a skating rink after school hours and is used by local residents

The school hosts a state-level basketball tournament annually.

Events and programs 

The school hosts events and programs, along with the following main events :
 Annual Day on which academic achievements are honoured.
 Sports Day on which athletic achievements are honoured.
 Patriotic Day on which students compete in a patriotic song competition.
 Activity Week (week of 15 August)

Alumni 

 Dr Vishal Sikka, CEO & MD of Infosys

References 

Schools in Vadodara
Christian schools in Gujarat